Park Chung-Hyo (born 13 February 1990) is a South Korean footballer who plays as goalkeeper for Yangju Citizen FC in K League 3.

Career
He was selected by Gyeongnam FC in the 2013 K League draft.

References

External links 

1990 births
Living people
Association football goalkeepers
South Korean footballers
Gyeongnam FC players
Chungju Hummel FC players
Gangneung City FC players
Suwon FC players
K League 1 players
K League 2 players
Korea National League players
Yonsei University alumni